Pierre Gamarra (10 July 1919 – 20 May 2009) was a French poet, novelist and literary critic, a long-time chief editor and director of the literary magazine Europe.Gamarra is best known for his poems and novels for the youth and for narrative and poetical works deeply rooted in his native region of Midi-Pyrénées.

Life
Pierre Gamarra was born in Toulouse on 10 July 1919. From 1938 until 1940, he was a teacher in the South of France. During the German Occupation, he joined various Resistance groups in Toulouse, involved in the writing and distributing of clandestine publications. This led him to a career as a journalist, and then, more specifically both as a writer and a literary journalist.

In 1948, Pierre Gamarra received the first  in Lausanne for his first novel, La Maison de feu. Members of the 1948 Veillon Prize jury included writers André Chamson, Vercors, Franz Hellens and Louis Guilloux. The novel is described in Books Abroad as "a beautifully written tale of humble life, which Philippe and Jammes would have liked".

From 1945 to 1951, he worked as a journalist in Toulouse. In 1951, Louis Aragon, Jean Cassou and André Chamson offered him a position in Paris as editor-in-chief of the literary magazine Europe. He occupied this position until 1974, when he became director of the magazine. Under Pierre Gamarra's direction, Europe continued the project initiated in 1923 by Romain Rolland and other writers. Until 2009, Pierre Gamarra also contributed to most of the magazines's issues with a book review column titled "La Machine à écrire" (The Typewriter).

Most of his novels take place in his native South-West of France: he wrote a novel trilogy based on the history of Toulouse and various novels set in that town, along the Garonne or in the Pyrenees.John L. Brown, in  World Literature Today, writes that Pierre Gamarra's descriptions of Toulouse, its people and its region were "masterly", "skillfully and poetically" composed "with a vibrant lyricism" and that:  Pierre Gamarra is also the author of The Midnight Roosters, a novel set in Aveyron during the French Revolution. The book was adapted for the French television channel FR3 in 1973. The film, casting , was shot in the town of Najac.

In 1955, he published one of his best known novels, Le Maître d’école; the book and its sequel La Femme de Simon (1962) received critical praise.Reviewing his 1957 short stories collection Les Amours du potier, Lois Marie Sutton deems that, although war affects the plots of many of "all (those) delightful thirteen stories", "it is the light-hearted plot that Gamarra maneuvers best" and that "as in his previous publications, (the author) shows himself to be a master delineator of the life of the average peasant and employee."

Pierre Gamarra died in Argenteuil on 20 May 2009, leaving a substantial body of work, not yet translated into English for the most part. The Encyclopædia Britannica sees in him a "delightful practitioner with notable drollery and high technical skills" in the art of children's poetry and children's stories. His poems and fables are well known by French schoolchildren.

Selection of works

Literature for the youth

Stories 

 Les Vacances de tonton 36 (2006)
 Moustache et ses amis de toutes les couleurs (2005) 

New edition of Moustache et ses amis (1974)
 Douze tonnes de diamant (1978)  
L'Aventure du Serpent à plumes, Prize for the Youth 1961
Berlurette trilogy:
 Berlurette contre Tour Eiffel (1961)
 Le Trésor de Tricoire (1959)
Le Mystère de la Berlurette (1957)
 La Rose des Karpathes, (1955)

 The Bridge on the River Clarinette in Cricket: the magazine for children, vol. 2 No. 11, (La Salle, Illinois) 1975, (p. 22-29) – illustrated by Marilyn Hafner, translated by Paulette Henderson
 Meet your author (op. cit. pp. 30–33),  Paulette Henderson

Fables collections 
 Salut, Monsieur de La Fontaine (2005),  Frédéric Devienne, 
 La Mandarine et le Mandarin (1970)

Poetry 

 Mon cartable et autres poèmes à réciter (2006) 
 Des mots pour une maman (1984)  
 Voici des maisons (1979)  
 Les Mots enchantés (1952)

'My schoolbag', in Berthe Mouchette Celebration, Melbourne Alliance française  (2019), p. 74-75

CD 
 Les Aventuriers de l'alphabet (2002)

Adaptations

Novels
 L'Empreinte de l'ours (2010), De Borée (Sayat) 
 Les Coqs de minuit (new ed.  including Rosalie Brousse) 2009, De Borée 
 Le Maître d'école (new ed. including La Femme de Simon) 2008, De Borée 
 Les Lèvres de l’été (1986) 
 Le Fleuve palimpseste PUF (1985) ; SGDL Prize for the novel
 Cantilène occitane (1979) 
 La Femme et le Fleuve (1952)
 L’assassin a le prix Goncourt (1951)
Les Enfants du pain noir (1950) 
 La Maison de feu (1948), Éditions La Baconnière (Neuchatel)/Éditions de Minuit, 
Reedited De Borée (2014) 
Editions of the book since 1948 
 Toulouse trilogy:
 72 soleils, 1975 
 L'Or et le Sang, 1970 
 Les Mystères de Toulouse, 1967

Short stories 
 Les Amours du potier,  (Neuchatel), 1957
 Un cadavre; Mange ta soupe, Prix National de la Résistance 1944

Poetry collections 
Mon Pays l'Occitanie (2009), Cahiers de la Lomagne
 Romances de Garonne (1990) 
 Essais pour une malédiction, Hélène Vacaresco Prize for Poetry 1943

About Pierre Gamarra

List of reviews of Pierre Gamarra’s books (Worldcat)
Les Lèvres de l’été reviewed by John L. Brown, World Literature Today, Vol. 61, No. 2, The Diary as Art (Spring, 1987), p. 236 (University of Oklahoma)
La Maison de feu reviewed by Georgette R. Schuler, Books Abroad, Vol. 23, No. 2 (Spring, 1949), p. 156

Literary journals special issues 
 Poésie Première  "Tarn en Poésie 2003: Avec Pierre Gamarra"
 Poésie Première No. 29 (2004)

Interviews
 Tohoku University Faculty of Letters Bulletin, No. 27 (Year 2007) (Sendai, Japan)
 Vivre en Val-D’Oise, No. 112, November–December 2008 (Argenteuil)

Homages 
 Charles Dobzynski, Michel Delon, Jean Métellus, Roger Bordier, Béatrice Didier, Raymond Jean, Bernard Chambaz, Michel Besnier, Marc Petit, Claude Sicard, Georges-Emmanuel Clancier, Henri Béhar, Gérard Noiret, Francis Combes, in Europe No. 966 (October 2009)
 Les Cahiers de la Lomagne (Los Quasèrns de la Lomanha), No. 15 (Year 2009), pp. 1 & 16-29 

Two streets (one in Argenteuil, one in Montauban) and a cul-de-sac in Boulazac—, two schools (one in Montauban, the other in Bessens)— and two public libraries (one in Argenteuil, the other in Andrest) are named after Pierre Gamarra.

Notes

See also

Europe (magazine)

References

External resources

Encyclopædia Britannica about Pierre Gamarra

Encyclopædia Universalis article
Pierre Gamarra in the Dictionary of the workers' movement
Pierre Gamarra on the website of  

1919 births
2009 deaths
Writers from Toulouse
French fabulists
French children's writers
French literary critics
20th-century French dramatists and playwrights
21st-century French dramatists and playwrights
French magazine editors
French male essayists
20th-century French novelists
21st-century French novelists
20th-century French poets
21st-century French poets
21st-century French male writers
French male poets
French male novelists
French male dramatists and playwrights
20th-century French essayists
21st-century French essayists
20th-century French male writers